Lagan Valley Island is a conference and events centre located on a small Island in Lisburn City in Northern Ireland. The building was opened for business in March 2001 and was officially opened in November 2001 by Her Majesty the Queen.

Lagan Valley Island has many functions; it is headquarters of Lisburn and Castlereagh City Council, and the facility is also a unique mix of civic, business and arts facilities – home to Lisburn and Castlereagh City Council head office, the Island Arts Centre, Council Chambers, a purpose-built conference centre and theatre, stunning wedding facilities and Lighters Restaurant.

The site on which Lagan Valley Island was built once played a significant role in Lisburn's industrial past. Previously the site for the Island Mill Spinning Company, famous for the production on linen through it, production at the mill came to an end in 1983. When this happened, Lisburn and Castlereagh City Council (then Lisburn Borough Council) purchased the site, and with funding assistance from the National Lottery to the Arts Council of Northern Ireland, regeneration of this site began.

Buildings and structures in Lisburn
Event venues established in 2001
Exhibition and conference centres in Northern Ireland
21st-century architecture in Northern Ireland